The Australia Cricket Team toured India from 25 October to 11 November 2009. The tour consisted of seven One Day International matches and the series was won by Australia with a final tally of 4-2 (one match was abandoned due to rain).

Squads

 James Hopes flew home after suffering a hamstring injury in the first ODI. Victorian Bowler Clint McKay took Hopes' place in the squad.
 Brett Lee flew home after suffering an elbow injury in the first ODI. New South Wales all-rounder Moises Henriques took Lee's place in the squad.
 Wicket-keeper Tim Paine flew home after seriously breaking his finger in the second ODI. South Australian wicket-keeper Graham Manou took Paine's place in the squad.
 Peter Siddle flew home after suffering soreness in the left side of his body in the fourth ODI. New South Wales bowler Burt Cockley took Siddle's place in the squad.
 Moises Henriques flew home after suffering a damaged hamstring in the fourth ODI. Victorian all-rounder Andrew McDonald took Henriques' place in the squad.

ODI series

1st ODI

2nd ODI

3rd ODI

4th ODI

5th ODI

6th ODI

7th ODI

Media coverage

Television
Sky Sports (live) – United Kingdom
Fox Sports (live) – Australia
NEO Cricket (live) – India and Middle East
Star TV (live) – Singapore and Malaysia
Supersport (live) – South Africa, Kenya and Zimbabwe
Zee Sports (live) – USA
CBS (live) – Barbados, Jamaica and Trinidad
DD National(live) – India
Geo Super – (live) Pakistan

References

External links
 Series home at ESPN Cricinfo

2009 in Australian cricket
International cricket competitions in 2009–10
2009-10
2009 in Indian cricket
Indian cricket seasons from 2000–01